The Abram Ackerman House is located in Saddle River, Bergen County, New Jersey, United States. The house was added to the National Register of Historic Places on January 10, 1983.  Town folklore states that President George Washington slept overnight in this house during the Revolutionary War.

See also
National Register of Historic Places listings in Bergen County, New Jersey

References

Houses on the National Register of Historic Places in New Jersey
Houses completed in 1781
Houses in Bergen County, New Jersey
National Register of Historic Places in Bergen County, New Jersey
Saddle River, New Jersey
Stone houses in New Jersey
New Jersey Register of Historic Places